Sam Samore is an American artist. His work is concerned with an exploration of privacy and myth in contemporary society. He has made numerous works which appropriate photo-techniques typically used by private detectives.

References

External links
samsamore.com (official website)

American photographers
Living people
Year of birth missing (living people)